The term "Throne of Austria" may refer to

Throne of the Holy Roman Empire from 1438 to 1806, as it was ruled by the House of Austria

Throne of the Austrian Empire, successor to the Austrian Monarchy, and predecessor of Austria-Hungary